Dolichoprosopus is a genus of longhorn beetles of the subfamily Lamiinae, containing the following species:

 Dolichoprosopus lethalis (Pascoe, 1866)
 Dolichoprosopus philippinensis Breuning, 1980
 Dolichoprosopus rondoni Breuning, 1965
 Dolichoprosopus sameshimai N. Ohbayashi, 2001
 Dolichoprosopus subcylindricus (Aurivillius, 1927)
 Dolichoprosopus yokoyamai (Gressitt, 1937)

References

Lamiini